Q'ara Apachita (Aymara q'ara bare, bald, apachita the place of transit of an important pass in the principal routes of the Andes; name in the Andes for a stone cairn, a little pile of rocks built along the trail in the high mountains, "bare apachita", also spelled Khara Apacheta) is a   mountain in the Bolivian Andes. It is located in the Cochabamba Department, Chapare Province, Villa Tunari Municipality.

References 

Mountains of Cochabamba Department